Poland has a three-tier administrative division since 1999. On the first level, Poland is divided into 16 voivodeships (Polish: województwa, singular – województwo). These are sub-divided in 380 counties (Polish: powiaty, singular – powiat), and these counties contain 2,477 municipalities, known as gminas (plural - gminy).

The municipalities are grouped into four categories:
66 cities with county rights, which are among the largest cities in Poland, which, in addition to being a municipality are also a county on its own and also have duties of such.
302 urban municipalities, which usually contain a small-to-medium-sized city alone.
652 urban-rural gminas, which contain all the other towns not in any of the above categories as well as surrounding rural areas
1,523 rural gminas, which do not have any towns located on their territory.

The status and the changes in borders of gminas are decided by the Council of Ministers. While their creation and dissolution is also usually decided by it, in exceptional cases, the parliament might direct the organ to issue ordinances ordering dissolution (as it was the case with gmina Ostrowice). These ordinances take effect on 1 January of the year following the year of publication of the ordinance.

Major changes to the framework (such as a restructuring of local administration or regulation of the duties and powers of the self-government) is only possible by law.

The current framework and regulation of powers and duties of the local self-government was adopted in 1998 and became effective on 1 January 1999, with special regulations concerning Warsaw came into existence in 2002. For more details, visit the article on gminas.

History of municipalities

Poland has had a long history of having gminas as an administrative division. In Interwar Poland, for instance, gminas also were local self-government entities. This stayed after World War II until the administrative reform in 1950.

That year, a large overhaul of local administration has been made. While the administrative divisions remained three-tier, gminas were substituted with almost 8,800 gromady, osiedla, and towns. The largest change, however, was that the local administrative units were stripped of their self-governing functions, were not legal entities on their own and instead became the executors of the will of higher administrative organs and, in practice, also of local party organs.

Over time, over half of these gromadas were merged into larger entities, until the larger gminas were reinstated in 1973, getting the number of municipalities at just 3,201. Further reductions brought the number down to below 2,900 by 1977. In the meanwhile, Poland abolished counties completely and introduced a new, two-tier administrative division, with 49 smaller voivodeships and gminas. Ostensibly the reforms of 1973 and 1975 were made in order to guide Poland through an accelerated period of growth, however, the real intent seemed to be the fear of what the government in Warsaw and party organs saw as excessive decentralisation. As a result, Poland became a country with local units possessing no degrees of self-government whatsoever.

This was an immediate concern with the fall of Communism, and in 1990, gminas were handed over powers of self-government and gained some autonomy. Quickly though, over 500 towns that previously had been separate municipalities were merged into urban-rural gminas; that made the number close to what is in 2021. The last major change happened with the return to three-tier administrative division in 1999, when counties were returned and some of the largest cities became city with powiat rights. Since then, the vast majority of changes was made with the Council of Ministry granting city rights to smaller settlements that previously lost their city rights, even as small as 330 inhabitants.

As of 1 January 2021, the number of gminas according to its type is the following:

List

The list contains 2,477 municipalities sorted by increasing TERYT (Polish for National Register of Territorial Land Apportionment Journal) code of such units, which is not given in the table. It is roughly sorted alphabetically by voivodeships, powiats and then gminas (with urban gminas first) as they appear in Polish.

The data for the local administrative units' names and their status (urban, rural-urban, rural) is given as of 1 January 2021. The cities on county rights, for emphasis, have been given in bold.
Population count and population density is given as of 30 June 2020.
Area, in km², is given as of 1 January 2020
Average population increase is given in per milles (‰) and has been averaged per annum for 2017-2020.

References

Gminas

Poland